Suicide at Strell Park is the debut release by the American alternative rock band The Autumns.

Track listing
"Pale Trembles a Gale" – 3:59
"Apple" – 3:56
"Rose Catcher" – 3:23
"Suicide at Strell Park" – 3:56

References

The Autumns albums
1997 EPs